Fejervarya sakishimensis is a species of frogs in the family Dicroglossidae. It is endemic to Taiwan and the Ryukyu Islands of Japan. It belongs to the Fejervarya limnocharis species complex.

Sources

 Matsui, Toda & Ota, 2007 : A new species of frog allied to Fejervarya limnocharis from southern Ryukyus, Japan (Amphibia: Ranidae). Current Herpetology, Kyoto, no. 2, .
http://research.amnh.org/vz/herpetology/amphibia/Amphibia/Anura/Dicroglossidae/Dicroglossinae/Fejervarya/Fejervarya-sakishimensis

Fejervarya
Amphibians of Taiwan
Amphibians of Japan
Amphibians described in 2007